Albert Ray Lewis (born October 6, 1960) is a former American football cornerback who played in the National Football League (NFL) for the Kansas City Chiefs and the Los Angeles/Oakland Raiders.

Early life and career
Lewis was a third-round draft pick (61st overall) by the Chiefs in the 1983 NFL Draft. His career spanned 16 seasons in which he recorded 42 interceptions, 12.5 sacks, 13 forced fumbles, 13 fumbles recoveries and 2 touchdowns. In addition to his play on defense, Lewis blocked 11 kicks in 11 seasons with the Chiefs.

Lewis was named the Chiefs MVP for the 1986 season after he recorded 69 tackles (61 solo), four interceptions, two fumble recoveries, one sack and one blocked punt. During his time in Kansas City, the Chiefs made the playoffs five times.  This included an appearance in the 1993 AFC Championship game. Lewis finished with 38 interceptions in 11 seasons with the Chiefs, the fifth-highest total in franchise history. Twenty of those came in his first four seasons before opposing teams decided not to throw to his side of the field as much. He played in 150 games for the Chiefs and was a starter in 128 of them. Lewis spent the final five seasons of his career with the Raiders. While with the team, he became the oldest player to score a defensive touchdown (38 years, 26 days) on November 1, 1998, when he returned an interception 74 yards for a touchdown against the Seattle Seahawks, his first and only interception return for a touchdown in his career.

Lewis retired from the NFL after the 1998 season.

Lewis was known for his excellent acceleration and speed, at one point running a 4.38 in the 40-yard dash. At 6' 2", he was one of the tallest cornerbacks in the NFL at the time. He also had 35-inch long arms and a 38-inch vertical leap. Lewis credited his strong determination and work-ethic to his father, Brad.

Legacy
Lewis was named to the Chiefs 25-Year All-Time Team in 1987 and was inducted into the Chiefs Hall of Fame on March 4, 2007.

In 1999, Lewis bought Greystone, a  horse ranch north in Centreville, Mississippi.

In July 2008, Lewis, along with former Chiefs teammate Kevin Ross, was named to the NFL Network's "Top 10 Cornerback Tandems" list. He was named as a finalist for the Pro Football Hall of Fame for the first time in 2023.

Personal life
Lewis has three children. His son Julian is a former defensive back for the University of New Mexico.

References

External links
Albert Lewis at the Kansas City Chiefs Hall of Fame

1960 births
Living people
People from Centreville, Mississippi
American football cornerbacks
American football safeties
American Conference Pro Bowl players
Kansas City Chiefs players
Los Angeles Raiders players
Oakland Raiders players
Grambling State Tigers football players
Ed Block Courage Award recipients